Timberlake is an unincorporated community in south-central Person County, North Carolina, United States. The population was 6,921 at the 2010 census.  It lies between Roxboro and Durham along the US Highway 501 corridor through Person County.  The economy of this community is dominated by tobacco agriculture and manufacturing.

History 
Timberlake was one of several communities affected by a 2010 tornado outbreak.

Culture
Although Timberlake has a fairly large population for an unincorporated municipality, it does not have a large number of businesses.  The majority of residents work and do business in the nearby municipalities of Roxboro, Durham and Hillsborough.

Demographics
According to the 2010 U.S. Census, there were 6,921 people in 2,684 households. The racial composition of the town was 82.9% White, 13.7% Black or African American, 0.5% Native American, 0.3% Asian, 0.1% Vietnamese, 1.1% some other race, and 1.5% of two or more races. 2.2% of the population were Hispanic or Latino of any race. Out of the population it only has a 5.5% unemployment rate.

Notable people
 Wendy Palmer - UNCG Women's Basketball Head Coach
 John Dee Holeman - American Blues Artist
 Mary Jayne Harrelson - two time NCAA national track champion, six time All-American

Points of interest
 Person County Airport

Education
 Helena Elementary School

References

Unincorporated communities in Person County, North Carolina
Unincorporated communities in North Carolina